Uriel Emil Pollack (born 4 April 1975) is an Israeli actor, known for his roles as Signor Romero on the ITV drama series The Great Fire (2014), Viktor on the ITV drama series Cleaning Up (2019), and Lev Malinovsky on the BBC medical drama Casualty (2019–2021).

Filmography

References

External links
 
 

1975 births
Living people
Male actors from Haifa
Israeli male film actors
Israeli male stage actors
Israeli male television actors
Israeli expatriates in the United Kingdom
21st-century Israeli male actors